Daniel Wagon (born 30 April 1976) is an Australian professional rugby league coach who is the head coach of the Limoux Grizzlies in the Elite One Championship. He is a former professional rugby league footballer who played for the Aston DSC Bulls in the AMNRL. He primarily played in the back row. He previously played for the St. George Dragons and Parramatta Eels in the National Rugby League where he started his career out in the centres before moving to the back row.

Background
Born in Brisbane, Queensland, Wagon played his junior rugby league for the Springwood Tigers and attended Runcorn State High School.

Playing career

NRL
After graduating high school, Wagon moved to Yamba, New South Wales and played for the Lower Clarence Magpies. Alongside Daniel Brown, younger brother of then-St George Dragons  Nathan Brown, Wagon travelled to Sydney, where he trialled for the Manly Sea Eagles and Dragons, eventually signing with St George. He spent two seasons with the club from 1997 to 1998 before joining the Parramatta Eels.

He was part of the Parramatta sides which suffered preliminary final heartbreak in 1999 and 2000. At the end of the season he played for the Parramatta Eels at lock forward in their 2001 NRL grand final loss to the Newcastle Knights.

In 2005, Wagon made 15 appearances for Parramatta as the club won the minor premiership and made it all the way to the preliminary final before suffering a shock 29-0 defeat by North Queensland. Wagon subsequently played for Parramatta in their unsuccessful finals campaigns in 2006 and 2007.  Wagon played one further year for Parramatta in 2008, making 17 appearances.  In total, Wagon suffered 4 preliminary final defeats and a grand final loss at the club in a period where the Parramatta Eels fell short of a long awaited premiership.

France
He joined French rugby leagues Elite One Championship for the 2009 season where he played for the Limoux Grizzlies. He finished playing in France at the beginning of April.

Return to Australia
He returned to Australia in 2009 with the Gundagai Tigers in the Group 9 rugby league competition before moving to the States.

United States
Wagon was one of the international players invited to the launch of the proposed NRLUS competition in the United States in July 2010. He also joined the Aston Bulls of the semi-professional American National Rugby League (AMNRL), making him the highest profile player in the AMNRL. He arrived in May 2010 and began training with the club in preparation for their first match for the Philadelphia Fight.

Career highlights
 First Grade Debut: for St. George against Illawarra, on 22 March 1997 (Round 3)
 Origin Selection: for Queensland Origin, 2001
 Test Selection: for the Kangaroo Tour of England in 2001, though he did not play a game on the three test tour.
 2001 minor premiership winner : With Parramatta
 2005 minor premiership winner : With Parramatta

Footnotes

References

External links
 Parramatta Eels player profile
 2001 Ashes profile 

1976 births
Living people
Aston Bulls players
Australian expatriate rugby league players
Australian expatriate sportspeople in France
Australian expatriate sportspeople in the United States
Australian rugby league coaches
Australian rugby league players
Expatriate rugby league players in France
Expatriate rugby league players in the United States
Indigenous Australian rugby league players
Limoux Grizzlies coaches
Limoux Grizzlies players
Parramatta Eels players
Queensland Rugby League State of Origin players
Rugby league centres
Rugby league five-eighths
Rugby league locks
Rugby league players from Brisbane
Rugby league second-rows
St. George Dragons players